Nurse's blind snake (Myriopholis nursii) is a species of snake in the family Leptotyphlopidae.

Etymology
The specific name, nursii, is in honor of English entomologist Charles George Nurse.

Geographic range
M. nursii is endemic to the southern Arabian Peninsula and the Horn of Africa.

Reproduction
M. nursii is oviparous.

References

Further reading
Adalsteinsson SA, Branch WR, Trape S, Vitt LJ, Hedges SB (2009). "Molecular phylogeny, classification, and biogeography of snakes of the family Leptotyphlopidae (Reptilia, Squamata)". Zootaxa 2244: 1-50. (Myriopholis nursii, new combination).
Anderson J (1896). In: Boulenger GA (1896). Catalogue of the Snakes in the British Museum (Natural History). Volume III., ... London: Trustees of the British Museum (Natural History). (Taylor and Francis, printers). xiv + 727 pp. + Plates I-XXV. (Glauconia nursii, new species, p. 591).
Hahn DE (1978). "A Brief Review of the Genus Leptotyphlops (Reptilia, Serpentes, Leptotyphlopidae) of Asia, with Description of a New Species". J. Herpetology 12 (4): 477-489. (Leptotyphlops blanfordi nursi [sic], new combination).
Wallach V, Williams KL, Boundy J (2014). Snakes of the World: A Catalogue of Living and Extinct Species. Boca Raton, Florida: CRC Press/Taylor & Francis Group. 1,237 pp. . (Leptotyphlops nursii, p. 376).

Myriopholis
Reptiles described in 1896